The 2016 Afghan Premier League is the fifth season of Afghan Premier League, the Afghan league for association football clubs, since its establishment in 2012. De Spin Ghar Bazan F.C. are the defending champions of the Premier League. The season started on 25 August 2016 with the 8 teams again in two groups. Shaheen Asmayee F.C. won the final of the Afghan Premier League against De Maiwand Atalan F.C. and qualified for the 2017 AFC Cup, the first time an Afghan team compete in the AFC Cup.

Group stage

Group A

Group B

Playoff Stage

Semifinals

First legs

Second legs

Third-place match

Final

References

Afghan Premier League seasons
Afghan
2016 in Afghan football